Liskinsky District  is an administrative and municipal district (raion), one of the thirty-two in Voronezh Oblast, Russia. It is located in the western central part of the oblast. Its administrative center is the town of Liski. Population:  The population of Liski accounts for 54.9% of the district's total population.

References

Notes

Sources

Districts of Voronezh Oblast